Double Dealing is a 1923 American comedy film directed by Henry Lehrman and featuring Hoot Gibson.

Cast
 Hoot Gibson as Ben Slowbell
 Helen Ferguson as The Slavey
 Betty Francisco as Stella Fern
 Eddie Gribbon as Alonzo B. Keene
 Gertrude Claire as Mother Slowbell
 Otto Hoffman as Uriah Jobson
 Frank Hayes as The sheriff
 John Francis Dillon as Jobson's assistant

See also
 List of American films of 1923
 Hoot Gibson filmography

References

External links

1923 films
American silent feature films
American black-and-white films
Films directed by Henry Lehrman
1923 comedy films
First National Pictures films
Silent American comedy films
Universal Pictures films
1920s American films